The Time of the Hunt is a Canadian drama film, directed by Francis Mankiewicz and released in 1972. An examination of masculinity, the film centres on Willy (Guy L'Écuyer), Richard (Marcel Sabourin) and Lionel (Pierre Dufresne), three friends on a weekend hunting trip who are instructing Richard's son Michel (Olivier L'Écuyer) in the rituals and practices of what they believe it means to be a man.

The film's cast also includes Frédérique Collin, Luce Guilbeault, Amulette Garneau and Monique Mercure.

The film won three Canadian Film Awards at the 24th Canadian Film Awards ceremony, for Best Cinematography (Michel Brault), Best Sound (Claude Hazanavicius) and a special achievement award for Mankiewicz.

It was later screened at the 1984 Festival of Festivals as part of Front & Centre, a special retrospective program of artistically and culturally significant films from throughout the history of Canadian cinema.

References

External links

1972 films
1972 drama films
1970s coming-of-age drama films
Canadian coming-of-age drama films
Films directed by Francis Mankiewicz
National Film Board of Canada films
1970s French-language films
French-language Canadian films
1970s Canadian films